Amurensin E is an oligostilbene found in Vitis amurensis. It is a pentamer of resveratrol.

References 

Resveratrol oligomers
Grape